The Australian Speedway Hall of Fame was inaugurated in 2007 to recognise the contributions made to Australian speedway.

In 2006 Speedway Australia formed the National Speedway Induction Committee (NSIC) consisting of competitors, promoters, media members, historians and vintage association members from all mainland states of Australia to nominate and select eligible candidates for induction into the Hall of Fame.

The inaugural Hall of Fame dinner was held in the Bradman Room at the Adelaide Oval in 2007.

Hall of Fame
Inductees:

 2007
 Grenville Anderson †
 Frank Arthur †
 Kym Bonython †
 Don Mackay †
 Hedlee McGee †
 Con Migro
 Ray Revell †
 Garry Rush
 Johnny Stewart †
 George Tatnell †
 2008
 Dick Britton
 Jeff Freeman †
 Mike Raymond
 John Sherwood †
 John Sidney
 Lionel Van Praag †
 Arthur 'Bluey' Wilkinson †
 Bill Wigzell †
 Jack Young †
 2009
 Steve Brazier
 Phil Crump
 Jimmy Davies †
 Peter Dodd
 Glen Dix
 Johnny Fenton
 Kevin Fischer †
 Peter Gurbiel
 Harry Neale †
 Alex Rowe †
 2011
 John Boulger
 Sir Jack Brabham †
 Alan Felsch
 Michael Figliomeni †
 Jeff Gitus †
 Bill Goode
 Sid Hopping
 Graeme McCubbin †
 Geoff Murphy
 Dennis Nash
 Blair Shepherd
 Fred Tracey †

† Deceased

References

Speedway in Australia
Halls of fame in Australia